Richard Charles James ("Reggie") Williams (born 8 August 1969) is a former English cricketer. He was a left-handed batsman and wicket-keeper who played for Gloucestershire in 44 first-class matches in a career that spanned 1990 to 2001.

Having made his Second XI championship debut in 1988, where he participated in a three-day draw against Kent. He played in the second team for the next three years, until he appeared for Gloucestershire against Glamorgan in July 1990.  He went without a batting or bowling appearance throughout the match, as the game was reduced to a single innings per side.

Appearing extensively throughout the second XI championship over the next seven years, he would wait until 2001 until he was able to get a regular first team place, as Jack Russell prevented him from claiming a place in the team. He retired from first-class cricket in 2001 having seen eleven years as a second-team wicket-keeper for a strong Gloucestershire side. He can now be found coaching rackets and cricket with Dr Waller at Clifton College.

External links
Reggie Williams at CricketArchive 

1969 births
English cricketers
Living people
Gloucestershire cricketers
Wicket-keepers